Pedro Rocha may refer to:

 Pedro Rocha (Uruguayan footballer) (1942-2013), Uruguayan football manager and former forward
 Pedro Rocha (Brazilian footballer) (born 1994), Brazilian football forward